The 2022 Oregon State Beavers baseball team represented Oregon State University in the 2022 NCAA Division I baseball season. The Beavers played their home games at Goss Stadium at Coleman Field as members of the Pac-12 Conference. The team was coached by Mitch Canham in his third season at Oregon State.

Preseason
The Beavers entered the season ranked in the Top-25 by four major poll organizations and were picked to finish second in the Pac-12 preseason coaches poll.

Pac-12 tournament
Oregon State finished second in the final regular season conference standing and earned the #2 seed in the inaugural Pac-12 baseball tournament. 

The Beavers put together a good run at the Pac-12 tournament, battling their way to the championship game before falling to Stanford. The Beavers were on the wrong end of a 25–22, 10-inning oddity against UCLA, but bounced back to eliminate the Bruins immediately afterward. Trailing 7–6 in the ninth inning of Game 2, OSU tied it on a UCLA fielding error and walked off with the win on an RBI single from Pac-12 Player of the Year Jacob Melton. In the championship game, OSU fought hard and was even tied with Stanford 5–5 at the middle of the seventh inning, but Stanford scored two runs in both the seventh and eighth to seal the win 9–5.

NCAA tournament
The Beavers earned the #3 overall seed in the 2022 NCAA Division I baseball tournament and were selected as host site for the Regional and Super Regional rounds. This is the sixth time Oregon State has been a national seed (2005, 2013, 2014, 2017, 2018) and ninth time hosting a regional.

Roster

Schedule and results

! style="" | Regular Season
|- valign="top"

|-bgcolor=bbffbb
| Feb 18 || vs. * || No. 18 || Surprise Stadium • Surprise, AZ || 21–1 || Hjerpe (1–0) || Lively (0–1) || None || 1–0 || 
|-bgcolor=bbffbb
| Feb 19 || vs. * || No. 18 || Surprise Stadium • Surprise, AZ || 13–5 || Pfennigs (1–0) || Kempner (0–1) || None || 2–0 ||
|-bgcolor=bbffbb
| Feb 20 || vs. Gonzaga* || No. 18 || Surprise Stadium • Surprise, AZ || 9–5 || Lawson (1–0) || Trystan (0–1) || None || 3–0 ||
|-bgcolor=bbffbb
| Feb 20 || vs. New Mexico* || No. 18 || Surprise Stadium • Surprise, AZ || 13–38 || Kmatz (1–0) || Russell (0–1) || None || 4–0 ||
|-bgcolor=bbffbb
| Feb 24 || vs. * || No. 14 || Surprise Stadium • Surprise, AZ || 13–3 || Brown (1–0) || Olson (0–1) || None || 5–0 ||
|-bgcolor=bbffbb
| Feb 25 || vs. Xavier* || No. 14 || Surprise Stadium • Surprise, AZ || 9–0 || Hjerpe (2–0) || Barnett (0–2) || None || 6–0 ||
|-bgcolor=bbffbb
| Feb 26 || vs. Xavier* || No. 14 || Surprise Stadium • Surprise, AZ || 5–4 || Kmatz (2–0) || Eisenhardt (0–2) || Verburg (1) || 7–0 ||
|-

|-bgcolor=bbbbbb
| Mar 1 || vs. * || No. 13 || Goss Stadium at Coleman Field • Corvallis, OR || colspan=7|RAINED OUT
|-bgcolor=bbffbb
| Mar 4 || vs. * || No. 13 || Goss Stadium at Coleman Field • Corvallis, OR || 7–2 || Hjerpe (3–0) || Frias (2–1) || Ferrer (1) || 8–0 ||
|-bgcolor=bbffbb
| Mar 5 || vs. UC Irvine* || No. 13 || Goss Stadium at Coleman Field • Corvallis, OR || 9–5 || Lawson (2–0) || Pinto (0–2) || Carpenter (1) || 9–0 ||
|-bgcolor=ffbbbb
| Mar 6 || vs. UC Irvine* || No. 13 || Goss Stadium at Coleman Field • Corvallis, OR || 2–310 || Ingebritson (1–0) || Verberg (0–1) || None || 9–1 ||
|-bgcolor=bbffbb
| Mar 11 || at  || No. 7 || Bailey–Brayton Field • Pullman, WA || 13–3 || Hjerpe (4–0) || Cottrell (1–3) || None || 10–1 || 1–0
|-bgcolor=bbffbb
| Mar 12 || at Washington State || No. 7 || Bailey–Brayton Field • Pullman, WA || 5–1 || Kmatz (3–0) || Taylor (2–1) || None || 11–1 || 2–0
|-bgcolor=ffbbbb
| Mar 13 || at Washington State || No. 7 || Bailey–Brayton Field • Pullman, WA || 8–9 || Barison (3–0) || Verberg (0–2) || None || 11–2 || 2–1
|-bgcolor=bbffbb
| Mar 15 || vs. * || No. 5 || Goss Stadium at Coleman Field • Corvallis, OR || 9–8 || Carpenter (1–0) || Reilly (0–1) || None || 12–2 || 2–1
|-bgcolor=ffbbbb
| Mar 16 || vs. Grand Canyon* || No. 5 || Goss Stadium at Coleman Field • Corvallis, OR || 7–13 || Young (1–2) || Lattery (0–1) || None || 12–3 || 2–1
|-bgcolor=bbffbb
| Mar 18 || vs. Arizona State || No. 5 || Goss Stadium at Coleman Field • Corvallis, OR || 21–0 || Hjerpe (5–0) || Tulloch (2–1) || None || 13–3 || 3–1
|-bgcolor=bbffbb
| Mar 19 || vs. Arizona State || No. 5 || Goss Stadium at Coleman Field • Corvallis, OR || 12–2 || Kmatz (4–0) || Luckman (2–1) || Sebby (1) || 14–3 || 4–1
|-bgcolor=ffbbbb
| Mar 20 || vs. Arizona State || No. 5 || Goss Stadium at Coleman Field • Corvallis, OR || 1–3 || Bodlovich (2–1) || Carpenter (1–1) || Peery (3) || 14–4 || 4–2
|-bgcolor=bbffbb
| Mar 23 || vs. Seattle* || No. 6 || Goss Stadium at Coleman Field • Corvallis, OR || 8–3 || Verburg (1–2) || Petersen (0–1) || None || 15–4 || 4–2
|-bgcolor=bbffbb
| Mar 25 || at California || No. 6 || Evans Diamond • Berkeley, CA || 10–4 || Hjerpe (6–0) || White (0–2) || None || 16–4 || 5–2
|-bgcolor=ffbbbb
| Mar 26 || at California || No. 6 || Evans Diamond • Berkeley, CA || 7–8 || Proctor (3–1) || Carpenter (1–2) || None || 16–5 || 5–3
|-bgcolor=bbffbb
| Mar 27 || at California || No. 6 || Evans Diamond • Berkeley, CA || 13–9 || Brown (2–0) || Stamos (1–1) || None || 17–5 || 6–3
|-bgcolor=bbffbb
| Mar 29 || at * || No. 3 || William Peccole Park • Reno, NV || 14–1311 || Sebby (1–0) || Morris (2–3) || Brown (1) || 18–5 || 6–3
|-bgcolor=bbffbb
| Mar 30 || at Nevada* || No. 3 || William Peccole Park • Reno, NV || 9–8 || Verburg (2–2) || Maas (0–1) || Brown (2) || 19–5 || 6–3
|-

|-bgcolor=ffbbbb
| Apr 1 || vs. Stanford || No. 3 || Goss Stadium at Coleman Field • Corvallis, OR || 0–110 || Dixon (2–1) || Sebby (1–1) || Mathews (1) || 19–6 || 6–4
|-bgcolor=bbffbb
| Apr 2 || vs. Stanford || No. 3 || Goss Stadium at Coleman Field • Corvallis, OR || 3–211 || Brown (3–0) || Dixon (2–2) || None || 20–6 || 7–4
|-bgcolor=ffbbbb
| Apr 3 || vs. Stanford || No. 3 || Goss Stadium at Coleman Field • Corvallis, OR || 5–8 || Mathews (4–1) || Verburg (2–3) || None || 20–7 || 7–5
|-bgcolor=bbffbb
| Apr 5 || at * || No. 5 || Ron Tonkin Field • Hillsboro, OR || 5–1 || Hunter (1–0) || Gillis (2–3) || None || 21–7 || 7–5
|-bgcolor=bbffbb
| Apr 8 || at USC || No. 5 || Dedeaux Field • Los Angeles, CA || 9–1 || Hjerpe (7–0) || Esqueda (1–1) || None || 22–7 || 8–5
|-bgcolor=bbffbb
| Apr 9 || at USC || No. 5 || Dedeaux Field • Los Angeles, CA || 3–2 || Kmatz (5–0) || Stromsborg (1–2) || Brown (3) || 23–7 || 9–5
|-bgcolor=bbffbb
| Apr 10 || at USC || No. 5 || Dedeaux Field • Los Angeles, CA || 7–3 || Lawson (3–0) || Keating (2–1) || None || 24–7 || 10–5
|-bgcolor=bbffbb
| Apr 14 || vs. * || No. 3 || Goss Stadium at Coleman Field • Corvallis, OR || 3–1 || Townsend (1–0) || Johnson (0–1) || Brown (4) || 25–7 || 10–5
|-bgcolor=bbffbb
| Apr 15 || vs. Long Beach State* || No. 3 || Goss Stadium at Coleman Field • Corvallis, OR || 8–2 || Hjerpe (8–0) || Fields (0–1) || Sebby (2) || 26–7 || 10–5
|-bgcolor=bbffbb
| Apr 16 || vs. Long Beach State* || No. 3 || Goss Stadium at Coleman Field • Corvallis, OR || 14–3 || Kmatz (6–0) || Voelker (4–2) || None || 27–7 || 10–5
|-bgcolor=ffbbbb
| Apr 18 || vs. No. 12 Gonzaga* || No. 2 || Goss Stadium at Coleman Field • Corvallis, OR || 6–13 || Rutherfor (2–0) || Hunter (1–1) || Zeglin (1) || 27–8 || 10–5
|-bgcolor=bbffbb
| Apr 19 || vs. No. 12 Gonzaga* || No. 2 || Goss Stadium at Coleman Field • Corvallis, OR || 9–4 || Verburg (3–3) || Mullan (1–1) || None || 28–8 || 10–5 
|-bgcolor=bbffbb
| Apr 22 || vs.  || No. 2 || Goss Stadium at Coleman Field • Corvallis, OR || 4–310 || Brown (4–0) || Raeth (4–4) || None || 29–8 || 11–5 
|-bgcolor=bbffbb
| Apr 23 || vs. Washington || No. 2 || Goss Stadium at Coleman Field • Corvallis, OR || 8–0 || Kmatz (7–0) || Kirchoff (4–4) || None || 30–8 || 12–5 
|-bgcolor=bbffbb
| Apr 24 || vs. Washington || No. 2 || Goss Stadium at Coleman Field • Corvallis, OR || 7–1 || Ferrer (1–0) || Emanuels (1–2) || Brown (5) || 31–8 || 13–5 
|-bgcolor=bbffbb
| Apr 26 || at Oregon* || No. 2 || PK Park • Eugene, OR || 4–2 || Verburg (4–3) || Ciuffetelli (1–3) || Brown (6) || 32–8 || 13–5 
|-bgcolor=ffbbbb
| Apr 29 || at  || No. 2 || Smith's Ballpark • Salt Lake City, UT || 1–2 || Sox (4–2) || Hjerpe (8–1) || McCleve (4) || 32–9 || 13–6
|-bgcolor=bbffbb
| Apr 30 || at Utah || No. 2 || Smith's Ballpark • Salt Lake City, UT || 9–1 || Kmatz (8–0) || Harris (1–2) || None || 33–9 || 14–6 
|-

|-bgcolor=bbffbb
| May 1 || at Utah || No. 2 || Smith's Ballpark • Salt Lake City, UT || 3–1 || Ferrer (2–0) || Day (1–5) || Brown (7) || 34–9 || 15–6 
|-bgcolor=bbffbb
| May 3 || at Oregon* || No. 2 || PK Park • Eugene, OR || 2–0 || Townsend (2–0) || Dallas (3–2) || Brown (8) || 35–9 || 15–6 
|-bgcolor=bbffbb
| May 6 || vs. Oregon || No. 2 || Goss Stadium at Coleman Field • Corvallis, OR || 5–1 || Hjerpe (9–1) || Gordon (2–2) || Ferrer (2) || 36–9 || 16–6
|-bgcolor=bbffbb
| May 7 || vs. Oregon || No. 2 || Goss Stadium at Coleman Field • Corvallis, OR || 8–7 || Carpenter (2–2) || Ayon (3–2) || Brown (9) || 37–9 || 17–6
|-bgcolor=bbffbb
| May 8 || vs. Oregon || No. 2 || Goss Stadium at Coleman Field • Corvallis, OR || 4–0 || Pfennigs (2–0) || Stoffal (0–2) || None || 38–9 || 18–6
|-bgcolor=bbffbb
| May 10 || vs. Portland* || No. 2 || Goss Stadium at Coleman Field • Corvallis, OR || 4–0 || Hunter (2–1) || Rembisz (0–1) || None || 39–9 || 18–6
|-bgcolor=bbffbb
| May 13 || at Arizona || No. 2 || Hi Corbett Field • Tucson, AZ || 12–9 || Ferrer (3–0) || Long (5–2) || None || 40–9 || 19–6
|-bgcolor=ffbbbb
| May 14 || at Arizona || No. 2 || Hi Corbett Field • Tucson, AZ || 2–5 || Irvin (5–3) || Kmatz (8–1) || None || 40–10 || 19–7
|-bgcolor=ffbbbb
| May 15 || at Arizona || No. 2 || Hi Corbett Field • Tucson, AZ || 5–10 || Barraza (2–0) || Carpenter (2–3) || None || 40–11 || 19–8
|-bgcolor=ffbbbb
| May 19 || vs. No. 23 UCLA || No. 2 || Goss Stadium at Coleman Field • Corvallis, OR || 1–4 || Rajcic (8–4) || Hjerpe (9–2) || Tredwell (4) || 40–12 || 19–9
|-bgcolor=ffbbbb
| May 20 || vs. No. 23 UCLA || No. 2 || Goss Stadium at Coleman Field • Corvallis, OR || 4–7 || Harrison (2–3) || Townsend (2–1) || Tredwell (5) || 40–13 || 19–10
|-bgcolor=bbffbb
| May 21 || vs. No. 23 UCLA || No. 2 || Goss Stadium at Coleman Field • Corvallis, OR || 9–3 || Pfennigs (3–0) || Austin (3–2) || None || 41–13 || 20–10
|-

! style="" | Postseason
|- valign="top"

|-bgcolor=bbffbb
| May 25 || vs. (7) Washington || No. 4 (2) || Scottsdale Stadium • Scottsdale, AZ || 13–8 || Verburg (5–3) || Velazquez (3–1) || None || 42–13 || 1–0
|-bgcolor=bbffbb
| May 26 || vs. (6) California || No. 4 (2) || Scottsdale Stadium • Scottsdale, AZ || 3–1 || Hjerpe (10–2) || Zobac (4–4) || Sebby (3) || 43–13 || 2–0
|-bgcolor=ffbbbb
| May 28 || vs. No. 20 (3) UCLA || No. 4 (2) || Scottsdale Stadium • Scottsdale, AZ || 22–2510 || Tredwell (3–1) || Brown (4–1) || None || 43–14 || 2–1
|-bgcolor=bbffbb
| May 28 || vs. No. 20 (3) UCLA || No. 4 (2) || Scottsdale Stadium • Scottsdale, AZ || 8–7 || Ferrer (4–0) || Austin (4–3) || None || 44–14 || 3–1
|-bgcolor=ffbbbb
| May 29 || vs. No. 3 (1) Stanford || No. 4 (2) || Scottsdale Stadium • Scottsdale, AZ || 5–9 || Bruno (5–1) || Sebby (1–2) || Pancer (2) || 44–15 || 3–2

|-

|-bgcolor=bbffbb
| June 3 || vs. (4)  || No. 3 (1) || Goss Stadium at Coleman Field • Corvallis, OR || 5–410 || Brown (5–1) || Bustamante (1–3) || None || 45–15 || 1–0
|-bgcolor=bbffbb
| June 4 || vs. (3)  || No. 3 (1) || Goss Stadium at Coleman Field • Corvallis, OR || 12–3 || Pfennigs (4–0) || Kysar (4–1) || Townsend (1) || 46–15 || 2–0
|-bgcolor=ffbbbb
| June 5 || vs. (2) Vanderbilt || No. 3 (1) || Goss Stadium at Coleman Field • Corvallis, OR || 1–8 || Futrell (9–3) || Kmatz (8–2) || Schultz (8) || 46–16 || 2–1
|-bgcolor=bbffbb
| June 6 || vs. (2) Vanderbilt || No. 3 (1) || Goss Stadium at Coleman Field • Corvallis, OR || 7–6 || Sebby (2–2) || Grayson (1–1) || Hjerpe (1) || 47–16 || 3–1

|-bgcolor=ffbbbb
| June 11 || vs. No. 14 Auburn || No. 3 || Goss Stadium at Coleman Field • Corvallis, OR || 5–7 || Sheehan (2–0) || Pfennigs (4–1) || Burkhalter (14) || 47–17 || 0–1
|-bgcolor=bbffbb
| June 12 || vs. No. 14 Auburn || No. 3 || Goss Stadium at Coleman Field • Corvallis, OR || 4–3 || Hjerpe (11–2) || Gonzalez (7–3) || Ferrer (3) || 48–17 || 1–1
|-bgcolor=ffbbbb
| June 13 || vs. No. 14 Auburn || No. 3 || Goss Stadium at Coleman Field • Corvallis, OR || 3–4 || Skipper (6–3) || Hunter (2–2) || Burkhalter (15) || 48–18 || 1–2

|-
|- style="text-align:center;"
|

Corvallis Regional

Corvallis Super Regional

Rankings

References

Oregon State Beavers baseball seasons
Oregon State
2022 in sports in Oregon
Oregon State